Emissions control may refer to:
 EMCON, military state of minimal radio emissions
 Technology involved in vehicle emissions control
 Regulation of air pollution via emission standards